In geometry, the chamfered dodecahedron is a convex polyhedron with 80 vertices, 120 edges, and 42 faces: 30 hexagons and 12 pentagons. It is constructed as a chamfer (edge-truncation) of a regular dodecahedron. The pentagons are reduced in size and new hexagonal faces are added in place of all the original edges. Its dual is the pentakis icosidodecahedron.

It is also called a truncated rhombic triacontahedron, constructed as a truncation of the rhombic triacontahedron. It can more accurately be called an order-5 truncated rhombic triacontahedron because only the order-5 vertices are truncated.

Structure
These 12 order-5 vertices can be truncated such that all edges are equal length. The original 30 rhombic faces become non-regular hexagons, and the truncated vertices become regular pentagons.

The hexagon faces can be equilateral but not regular with D symmetry.

It is the Goldberg polyhedron , containing pentagonal and hexagonal faces.

It also represents the exterior envelope of a cell-centered orthogonal projection of the 120-cell, one of  six (convex regular 4-polytopes).

Chemistry 

This is the shape of the fullerene ; sometimes this shape is denoted  to describe its icosahedral symmetry and distinguish it from other less-symmetric 80-vertex fullerenes.

Related polyhedra
This polyhedron looks very similar to the uniform truncated icosahedron which has 12 pentagons, but only 20 hexagons.

The chamfered dodecahedron creates more polyhedra by basic Conway polyhedron notation. The zip chamfered dodecahedron makes a chamfered truncated icosahedron, and Goldberg (2,2).

Chamfered truncated icosahedron 

In geometry, the chamfered truncated icosahedron is a convex polyhedron with 240 vertices, 360 edges, and 122 faces, 110 hexagons and 12 pentagons.

It is constructed by a chamfer operation to the truncated icosahedron, adding new hexagons in place of original edges. It can also be constructed as a zip (= dk = dual of kis of) operation from the chamfered dodecahedron. In other words, raising pentagonal and hexagonal pyramids on a chamfered dodecahedron (kis operation) will yield the (2,2) geodesic polyhedron. Taking the dual of that yields the (2,2) Goldberg polyhedron, which is the chamfered truncated icosahedron, and is also Fullerene C240.

Dual
Its dual, the hexapentakis chamfered dodecahedron has 240 triangle faces (grouped as 60 (blue), 60 (red) around 12 5-fold symmetry vertices and 120 around 20 6-fold symmetry vertices), 360 edges, and 122 vertices.

Hexapentakis chamfered dodecahedron

References

Bibliography

External links
 Vertex- and edge-truncation of the Platonic and Archimedean solids leading to vertex-transitive polyhedra Livio Zefiro
 VRML polyhedral generator (Conway polyhedron notation)

Goldberg polyhedra
Polyhedra
Mathematical notation